Upper Wharfedale School is a coeducational secondary school located in Threshfield, North Yorkshire, England. The school is named after Wharfedale, one of the Yorkshire Dales in which the school is located.

It is a non-selective community school administered by North Yorkshire County Council, with grammar schools also operating in the same catchment area.

Upper Wharfedale School offers GCSEs and BTECs as programmes of study for pupils. The school has also previously gained specialist status as a Sports College.

History 
The school was established in 1955.

Notable former pupils
Ted Mason, fell runner
Andrew Triggs Hodge, rower

References

External links
Upper Wharfedale School official website

Secondary schools in North Yorkshire
Wharfedale
Community schools in North Yorkshire
1955 establishments in England
Educational institutions established in 1955